Giles Lamb is a British music composer and sound designer. Lamb composed the trailer theme for the 2011 video game Dead Island, as well additional music and sound design for the films Valhalla Rising, Wild Country, Asylum and Blinded.

Awards
Lamb's musical score for Dead Island and its trailer won a Cannes Lions gold award in 2011.

References

External links

Year of birth missing (living people)
British film score composers
Living people
British male film score composers